Treutlen County is a county located in the east central portion of the U.S. state of Georgia.  As of the 2020 census, the population was 6,406. The county seat is Soperton.  It is host to the Million Pines Arts and Crafts Festival which occurs during the first weekend in November.

History
The state constitutional amendment to create the county was proposed by the Georgia General Assembly on August 21, 1917, and ratified November 5, 1918. The county is named for John A. Treutlen, Georgia's first state governor following adoption of the state Constitution of 1777.

Geography

The western portion of Treutlen County, west of Soperton, is located in the Lower Oconee River sub-basin of the Altamaha River basin. The eastern portion of the county is located in the Ohoopee River sub-basin of the larger Altamaha River basin.

Major highways

  Interstate 16
  U.S. Route 221
  State Route 15
  State Route 29
  State Route 46
  State Route 56
  State Route 78
  State Route 86
  State Route 171
  State Route 199
  State Route 199 Spur
  State Route 227
  State Route 297
  State Route 298
  State Route 404 (unsigned designation for I-16)

Adjacent counties
 Emanuel County (northeast)
 Montgomery County (southeast)
 Wheeler County (southwest)
 Laurens County (west)
 Johnson County (northwest)

Demographics

2000 census
As of the census of 2000, there were 6,854 people, 2,531 households, and 1,824 families living in the county.  The population density was 34 people per square mile (13/km2).  There were 2,865 housing units at an average density of 14 per square mile (6/km2).  The racial makeup of the county was 65.67% White, 33.10% Black or African American, 0.06% Native American, 0.26% Asian, 0.32% from other races, and 0.58% from two or more races.  1.15% of the population were Hispanic or Latino of any race.

There were 2,531 households, out of which 33.20% had children under the age of 18 living with them, 50.20% were married couples living together, 17.30% had a female householder with no husband present, and 27.90% were non-families. 25.30% of all households were made up of individuals, and 12.00% had someone living alone who was 65 years of age or older.  The average household size was 2.55 and the average family size was 3.05.

In the county, the population was spread out, with 26.00% under the age of 18, 11.90% from 18 to 24, 27.20% from 25 to 44, 21.70% from 45 to 64, and 13.20% who were 65 years of age or older.  The median age was 34 years. For every 100 females there were 98.70 males.  For every 100 females age 18 and over, there were 97.10 males.

The median income for a household in the county was $24,644, and the median income for a family was $32,762. Males had a median income of $26,476 versus $20,286 for females. The per capita income for the county was $13,122.  About 20.80% of families and 26.30% of the population were below the poverty line, including 31.80% of those under age 18 and 33.00% of those age 65 or over.

2010 census
As of the 2010 United States Census, there were 6,885 people, 2,543 households, and 1,770 families living in the county. The racial makeup of the county was 65.2% white, 32.6% black or African American, 0.2% Asian, 0.2% American Indian, 0.8% from other races, and 1.0% from two or more races. Those of Hispanic or Latino origin made up 1.5% of the population. In terms of ancestry, 22.3% were English, 14.3% were American, and 8.2% were Irish.

Of the 2,543 households, 36.0% had children under the age of 18 living with them, 46.4% were married couples living together, 18.1% had a female householder with no husband present, 30.4% were non-families, and 27.1% of all households were made up of individuals. The average household size was 2.53 and the average family size was 3.07. The median age was 36.8 years.

The median income for a household in the county was $36,467 and the median income for a family was $48,110. Males had a median income of $32,500 versus $23,807 for females. The per capita income for the county was $16,710. About 23.2% of families and 24.7% of the population were below the poverty line, including 35.1% of those under age 18 and 13.1% of those age 65 or over.

2020 census

As of the 2020 United States census, there were 6,406 people, 2,490 households, and 1,654 families residing in the county.

Politics

Communities
 Lothair
 Soperton (county seat)

See also

 National Register of Historic Places listings in Treutlen County, Georgia
List of counties in Georgia

References 

 
Georgia (U.S. state) counties
1918 establishments in Georgia (U.S. state)
Populated places established in 1918